Miłomłyn  is a town in Ostróda County, Warmian-Masurian Voivodeship, Poland, with 2,256 inhabitants (2004).

Among the sights of Miłomłyn are the historic Saint Bartholomew church and the Elbląg Canal, which runs through the town.

External links
Official town webpage

Cities and towns in Warmian-Masurian Voivodeship
Ostróda County